Anna Mikhailovna Kaptsova (1860-1927), was a Russian industrialist. She was the daughter of Mikhail Vasilyevich Zalogin and married to Alexander Sergeevich Kaptsov. She was the president of the Kaptsov Trading Company from 1897. She was also known as a philanthropist. Two schools in Moscow was named after her.

References
 Капцов Л. Н., Солнцев Г. С. Николай Александрович Капцов. Серия «Выдающиеся ученые физического факультета МГУ». Вып. IV.— М.:Физический факультет МГУ, 2001.— 96 с.

19th-century businesswomen from the Russian Empire
1860 births
1927 deaths
Russian philanthropists